Alfred W. "Count" Gedney (May 10, 1849 – March 26, 1922), was an American professional baseball player.

That service makes Gedney a "major leaguer". In 1870 he had been regular left fielder for the Union club of Morrisania, Bronx, one of fifteen professional teams, in the old Association, during its last season.

Sources

Wright, Marshall (2000). The National Association of Base Ball Players, 1857-1870. Jefferson, NC: McFarland & Co. .

Major League Baseball left fielders
Morrisania Unions players
Troy Haymakers players
Brooklyn Eckfords players
New York Mutuals players
Philadelphia Athletics (NA) players
Baseball players from New York (state)
Burials at Green-Wood Cemetery
19th-century baseball players
1849 births
1922 deaths